Annet Nyakecho also known as Okwenye Annet Nyakecho (born 27 August 1982) is a Ugandan politician, business woman, and woman Member of Parliament of Tororo North County, Tororo District. She is an Independent politician. She served as woman MP for Otuke District in the 9th parliament, and in the 10th parliament, she served as the MP for Tororo North. She is currently the Tororo woman member of parliament in the 11th Parliament of Uganda.

After the creation of Otuke district in 2009, this gave her the opportunity and in 2011, she was the aspirant for the district woman seat but did not win. She later stood and won for her first term (in the ninth parliament) on the seat on an National Resistance Movement ticket as the youthful MP beating seven other contestants although she had no plans of joining of politics.

Education 

In 1994, she completed her Primary Leaving Examinations at Rock View School, Tororo. In 1998, attained her Uganda Certificate of Education from Nkono Memorial S.S., Kaliro. In 2000, she was awarded a Uganda Advanced Certificate of Education from City High School, Kololo and later joined Makerere University for bachelor's degree in Development Studies (2008).

Career life 
She was employed as the Research Assistant at MTN Head Office(2000), Nutrition and Early Childhood Development Project, Tororo (2001–2002), and African Centre for Institutional Development, Kampala (2002–2003).

Political life 
She served at the Parliament of Uganda as the Member of Foreign Affairs Committee(2011–2013), Member of Budget Committee (2011–2013), Member of Legal and Parliament Affairs Committee (2013–2013), and Vice Chairperson Committee of Science and Technology (2015–2016). She also served as the Member of Parliament at the Parliament of Uganda in the ninth, tenth and eleventh parliament.

She served as the chairperson Parliament's Information, Communication and Technology Committee (ICT) but was later dropped from the position by the government Chief Whip Ruth Nankabirwa and replaced by Dokolo North MP Paul Amoru.

Annet Nyakecho, her husband Levi Otim, brother and many others who were found at the home of former Security Minister, Lt. Gen. Henry Tumukunde were arrested and detained. She was the national coordinator of Lt. Gen. Henry Tumukunde 2021 presidential campaign.

Additional role 
She served at the Parliament of Uganda as the member on Public Accounts Committee, and Committee on Public Service and Local Government.

Personal life 
She is married to Levi Otim. She is a Christian of the Anglican faith.

See also 

 List of members of the eleventh Parliament of Uganda
 List of members of the tenth Parliament of Uganda
 List of members of the ninth Parliament of Uganda
 National Resistance Movement
 Independent politician
 Otuke District
 Tororo District
 Ruth Nankabirwa
 Paul Amoru

External links 

 Website of the Parliament of Uganda.
 Hon Annet Nyakecho on Facebook
 Nyakecho Annet on Twitter
 HON.Nyakecho Annet on Linkedin
 https://theinsider.ug/index.php/2018/10/09/exclusive-mp-nyakecho-dumps-mp-lover-elopes-with-rdcs-son/

References 

Living people
1982 births
National Resistance Movement politicians
Independent politicians
Makerere University alumni
Women members of the Parliament of Uganda
Members of the Parliament of Uganda
People from Tororo District
21st-century Ugandan politicians
21st-century Ugandan women politicians